Kim Dongsu is a South Korean football player who currently plays for Busan IPark in the K League 2.

Playing career
In January 2014, moved from South Korea to Hamburg to the U-19 of Hamburger SV. After five junior Bundesliga games, he made the leap to the B-team, Hamburger SV II, half a year later and was there regulars of the strong regional league team, which marched unbeaten through the first round.

Kim joined J1 League club Omiya Ardija in 2017. On June 6, 2018, he debuted against AC Nagano Parceiro in Emperor's Cup.

On 31 January 2019, Kim moved to Germany again and this time, he signed with VfB Lübeck until June 2020.

References

External links

1995 births
Living people
South Korean footballers
J1 League players
J2 League players
Hamburger SV II players
Omiya Ardija players
VfB Lübeck players
Association football central defenders